Gurudas Vasudeo Naik Tari (unknown – 15 March 2008) was an Indian politician and social worker from Goa. He was a former member of the Goa Legislative Assembly, representing the Sanguem Assembly constituency from 1980 to 1984.

Early and personal life
Gurudas Vasudeo Naik Tari was born and hailed from Taripanta, Sanguem. He was married to Shanti Naik, a forest contractor. He had a keen interest in reading dramas and had a special interest in social work.

Death
On 15 March 2008, Tari died as a result of a heart attack while on a business trip with his friends at Nanded, India.

Positions held
 Member of Sanguem V.K. Sahakari Society, Sanguem
 Member of the Select Committee on Bill No. 27 of 1980 
 The Goa, Daman and Diu Education Bill, 1980
 Member Committee on Petitions 1980–81

References

Year of birth unknown
2008 deaths
Indian politicians
People from South Goa district
Goa MLAs 1980–1984
Former members of Indian National Congress from Goa
20th-century Indian politicians